Bournemouth West is a parliamentary constituency in Dorset represented in the House of Commons of the UK Parliament since 2010 by Conor Burns, a Conservative

Constituency profile
The seat covers Bournemouth Town Centre and the northern suburbs.

Residents are younger and slightly less wealthy than in neighbouring Bournemouth East.

Boundaries 
1950–1974: The County Borough of Bournemouth wards of Central, East Cliff, Kinson, Moordown North, Moordown South, Redhill Park, Westbourne, West Cliff, and Winton.

1974–1983: The County Borough of Bournemouth wards of Central, East Cliff, Kinson North, Kinson South, Redhill Park, Westbourne, West Cliff, and Winton.

1983–1997: The Borough of Bournemouth wards of Ensbury Park, Kinson, Redhill Park, Talbot Woods, Wallisdown, Westbourne, West Cliff, and Winton, and the Borough of Poole wards of Alderney, Bourne Valley, and Canford Magna.

1997–2010: The Borough of Bournemouth wards of Central, East Cliff, Ensbury Park, Kinson, Redhill Park, Talbot Woods, Wallisdown, Westbourne, West Cliff, and Winton.

2010–2019: The Borough of Bournemouth wards of Central, Kinson North, Kinson South, Redhill and Northbourne, Talbot and Branksome Woods, Wallisdown and Winton West, Westbourne and West Cliff, and Winton East, and the Borough of Poole wards of Alderney and Branksome East.

2019–present: Bournemouth, Christchurch and Poole wards of Alderney and Bourne Valley, Bournemouth Central, Kinson, Redhill and Northbourne, Talbot and Branksome Woods, Wallisdown and Winton West, Westbourne and West Cliff, Winton East

The constituency includes the western portion of Bournemouth, from the Kinson, Ensbury Park, Alder Hills, Winton and Talbot Woods areas down towards the town centre and the West Cliff. Following a boundary change for the 2010 general election, the constituency gained the Branksome area from Poole whilst losing East Cliff to the neighbouring Bournemouth East constituency.

The constituency contains Labour's best ward in Bournemouth in the district of Kinson, but the seat has elected Conservatives at every election since its creation in 1950; therefore it is considered a Conservative safe seat.

With the exception of the period 1983–1997 (when it was in Bournemouth East), Bournemouth Town Centre has been in this constituency since its creation in 1950.

Members of Parliament

Elections

Elections in the 2010s

Elections in the 2000s

Elections in the 1990s

Elections in the 1980s

Elections in the 1970s

Elections in the 1960s

Elections in the 1950s

See also 
 List of parliamentary constituencies in Dorset

Notes

References

External links 
nomis Constituency Profile for Bournemouth West — presenting data from the ONS annual population survey and other official statistics.

Parliamentary constituencies in Dorset
Constituencies of the Parliament of the United Kingdom established in 1950
Politics of Bournemouth